Ross David Dyer (born 12 May 1988) is an English semi-professional footballer who last played for Conference North side Tamworth, where he played as a striker.

He can name Mansfield Town, Hednesford Town, Forest Green Rovers and Halifax Town among his previous clubs.

Playing career

Hednesford Town
Dyer began his career with Hednesford Town, where after coming through the youth system, he eventually progressed to become the club's first team captain.

Forest Green Rovers
He joined Forest Green Rovers in May 2010 on a one-year deal. However he suffered an ankle injury in September 2010 that ruled him out temporarily. He scored five goals in 32 games in the 2010–11 season for Forest Green.

Mansfield Town
Dyer then joined Mansfield Town in August 2011, with his £6,000 compensation fee being paid by Mansfield Town's fundraising group the 12th Stag. He scored nine goals in 47 appearances in the 2011–12 season.

He was limited to one appearance in the 2012–13 campaign after picking up a cruciate knee ligament injury, as the "Stags" won promotion to the Football League as champions of the Conference Premier. He made his Football League debut on 3 August 2013, starting in a 2–0 defeat to Scunthorpe United.

Hereford United (loan)
On 11 October 2013, he joined Hereford United on a one-month loan deal. After three seasons with Mansfield he was released at the end of the 2013–14 season.

F.C. Halifax Town
On Friday 27 June 2014, it was announced that Dyer had signed for Conference Premier FC Halifax Town.

Tamworth
On 18 June 2015, Dyer joined Conference North side Tamworth on a one-year deal, following his release from FC Halifax Town.

Honours
Mansfield Town
Conference Premier: 2012–13

References

External links

1988 births
Living people
Sportspeople from Stafford
English footballers
Association football forwards
Hednesford Town F.C. players
Forest Green Rovers F.C. players
Mansfield Town F.C. players
Hereford United F.C. players
FC Halifax Town players
Southport F.C. players
AFC Telford United players
Tamworth F.C. players
National League (English football) players
English Football League players